Kaya Rose Scodelario-Davis (née Humphrey; born 13 March 1992) is an English actress. She is best known for her roles as Effy Stonem on the E4 teen drama Skins (2007–2010, 2013), and Teresa in the Maze Runner film series (2014–2018). Other roles include Catherine Earnshaw in Andrea Arnold's Wuthering Heights (2011), Carina Smyth in Pirates of the Caribbean: Dead Men Tell No Tales (2017), Carole Ann Boone in Extremely Wicked, Shockingly Evil and Vile (2019), Haley Keller in Crawl (2019), Katarina Baker in the Netflix original series Spinning Out (2020) and Claire Redfield in Resident Evil: Welcome to Raccoon City (2021).

Early life
Scodelario was born Kaya Rose Humphrey on 13 March 1992 in Haywards Heath, West Sussex. Her mother, Katia Scodelario, is a Brazilian accountant from Itu, São Paulo, who moved to England in 1990; Scodelario's surname comes from her mother's Italian grandfather. Her father, Roger Humphrey, was English and died in November 2010.

Her parents divorced when Scodelario was one year old, and her mother brought her to London when she was four. They spent their first night on the street before finding a council flat on Holloway Road. Scodelario adopted her mother's surname and spoke Portuguese at home. She attended Bishop Douglass Catholic School and then Islington Arts and Media School. She participated in school plays and found drama an escape from bullying. Her mother took on multiple jobs to make ends meet and had clinical depression that worsened during Scodelario's teens from the strain. Scodelario said she wanted to help, but did not know how at the time and moved out to a flat in Camden.

Career

In 2007, at the age of 14 and with no acting experience, Scodelario was cast in the first series of Skins as Effy Stonem. At the auditions, Scodelario became discouraged as she felt she was too young, but a producer told her to stay and she was asked to read for the part. While Scodelario's role in the first series had minimal speaking lines, her character developed considerably during the second series. She eventually became the central character in the third and fourth series after the cast had been replaced with a new generation of characters. This made Effy one of the only characters to appear from series 1 all the way through to series 4. Filming began in July and Scodelario said that 18 November 2009 was her last day of filming the series and that she would miss being on the show.

Scodelario left after the fourth series, making way for the third generation of characters. Her performance was praised by critics, and she was nominated twice for Best Actress at the TV Quick Awards, in 2009 and 2010. In the episode "Fire", one of three parts of the seventh (and final) season of Skins, Scodelario reprised the role of Effy. It is a two-part depiction of her life as an adult, lasting two hours. She claims "Fire" is "more like a movie" and that she could relate to Effy's struggle to change from a teenager into an adult.

Scodelario made her film debut in the science fiction-thriller film Moon, which premiered at the 2009 Sundance Film Festival, receiving positive reviews. In her second film, Shank, released on 26 March 2010, she played teenager Tasha. In addition, she appeared in the 2010 remake of Clash of the Titans as Peshet.

In April 2010, Scodelario confirmed her casting as Cathy in an adaptation of Wuthering Heights directed by Andrea Arnold. The film premiered at the Venice Film Festival in September 2011 to generally positive reviews, and Scodelario was hailed as a "heart-wrenching revelation". Wuthering Heights also played at several other international film festivals, including the 2011 Toronto International Film Festival, the London Film Festival, and the 2012 Sundance Film Festival.

In 2011, she signed on to play Sally Weaver in a British thriller, Twenty8k.  The film was released in September 2012. In late June, Scodelario announced that she had signed on to star in Now Is Good with Dakota Fanning. The film is based on Jenny Downham's novel Before I Die, about a teenage girl with leukaemia who makes a list of things to do before she dies. She portrays Zoey, the protagonist's best friend. In late September 2011, Scodelario filmed a television serial for BBC One, True Love, an improvised series comprising five stand-alone episodes, each covering a different love-related dilemma. She is cast in the third storyline as Karen, the love interest of her teacher, portrayed by Billie Piper.

In January 2012, Scodelario made her first American film, The Truth About Emanuel, in Los Angeles. She stars as the title character, Emanuel, a troubled 17-year-old girl who babysits her new neighbour Linda's "baby", which is actually a very lifelike doll. It had a limited Release on 10 January 2014. In April 2012, Scodelario shot a cameo appearance for the film Spike Island. She also participated in an advertising campaign for Korean jewelry brand J. Estina. In 2013 she starred in the four-part Channel 4 drama series Southcliffe, which tells the story of a fictional English town devastated by a spate of shootings, exploring the tragedy through the eyes of a journalist and those close to the victims.

She signed on to the film franchise The Maze Runner in April 2013 as the lead female character, Teresa, in the first film, based on the novel of the same name by James Dashner released in September 2014, and its sequel, Maze Runner: The Scorch Trials, released in September 2015. She starred in lead roles in the home-invasion thriller Tiger House in 2015  and the film adaptation of The Kings Daughter, however after production wrapped in 2014 this film was finally released in 2022. She also had a starring role in the sequel Pirates of the Caribbean: Dead Men Tell No Tales, released on 26 May 2017.

Scodelario reprised the role of Teresa in Maze Runner: The Death Cure. The film was set for release on 17 February 2017, but after her co-star Dylan O'Brien was injured on set, the film was pushed back to 26 January 2018.

The year 2019 brought new projects for Scodelario. The first, released in May 2019, was Extremely Wicked, Shockingly Evil and Vile, about serial killer Ted Bundy, where she portrays his wife Carole Ann Boone. She then went on to play the lead in Alexandre Aja's horror film, Crawl, which was released in July 2019, to positive reviews. Her next film, 2021's Resident Evil: Welcome to Raccoon City, saw Scodelario lead another horror film, this time portraying video game character Claire Redfield as a main protagonist.

Scodelario then signed up to lead a new Netflix series, an edgy figure skating drama called Spinning Out in 2019. Debuting in early 2020, the series explored multi-person mental illness within a family and its interaction with high-level competitive sports.

In Spring 2019, Scodelario became the face of Cartier's new jewelry line, Clash de Cartier, and filmed the latest Agatha Christie miniseries adaptation, The Pale Horse, for Amazon and BBC.  In August 2021, Scodelario joined dramedy Don't Make Me Go being developed under Amazon Studios.

Personal life
Scodelario dated her Skins co-star Jack O'Connell for about a year before they split up in June 2009, remaining good friends. She was in a relationship with Elliott Tittensor from late 2009 to early 2014. During their relationship, she supported Tittensor after his arrest for hitting someone while driving an uninsured car.

Scodelario and Benjamin Walker began dating during the filming of The King's Daughter in early 2014 and they married in December 2015. Both subsequently adopted the surname "Scodelario-Davis". Their first child, a son, was born in November 2016. On September 18 2021, Scodelario announced she was pregnant with her second child. In December 2021, she gave birth to a daughter.

She was voted 13th in the UK edition of FHM's 100 World's Sexiest Women 2010.

In October 2017, Scodelario revealed that she had been sexually assaulted when she was 12 years old.

Filmography

Film

Television

Music videos

Awards and nominations

References

External links

 
 
 
 

1992 births
Living people
21st-century English actresses
Actresses from London
Actresses from Sussex
Actresses of Brazilian descent
British actors of Latin American descent
English child actresses
English expatriates in New Zealand
English female models
English film actresses
English people of Brazilian descent
English people of Italian descent
English people of Portuguese descent
English television actresses
People from Haywards Heath
People from Holloway, London
Actors with dyslexia